Aviat Networks (NASDAQ:AVNW) is a global provider of microwave transport and backhaul solutions, providing public and private operators with communications infrastructure to accommodate the growth of IP-centric, multi-gigabit data services.

Headquartered in Austin, Texas since November 2019, Aviat Networks has operations in North and South America, Africa, Asia Pacific, Europe and the Middle East.

The company's President and CEO is Peter Smith, who was appointed on January 2, 2020.

History
The company was founded on January 29, 2007 with the merger of Harris Corporation’s Microwave Communications Division and Stratex Networks and incorporated under the name Harris Stratex Networks. The company renamed and rebranded itself to become Aviat Networks on January 28, 2010. 
Stratex Networks was the new name for Digital Microwave Corporation (DMC) which was founded in 1984 in San Jose, California.

In February 2009, Harris Stratex acquired Telsima, developer and provider of WiMAX Forum Certified products for use in next-generation broadband wireless networks, for $12 million. In September 2008, Harris Stratex announced a partnership agreement with Telsima for end-to-end 4G network solutions.

In July 2022, Aviat completed the acquisition of Redline Communications, a leading provider in mission-critical data infrastructure.

Name and ticker symbol change 
On January 28, 2010, at the opening of the Nasdaq trading session, Harris Stratex Networks announced they had renamed their company to become Aviat Networks. Along with the name change the company unveiled new corporate branding with a new company logo and relaunch of the corporate website.  The company also changed their NASDAQ ticker symbol to AVNW. The new symbol began trading on the morning of January 29, 2010, retiring the old HSTX; this date also marked the company's third anniversary since incorporation.

Customer profile and recent contracts 
Aviat Networks customers include fixed and mobile operators, public safety operators, state and federal governments, utilities, oil and gas companies, broadcast and transportation network operators worldwide.

Products and solutions 
Aviat's portfolio of wireless products encompasses microwave and millimeter wave bands between 5 and 80 GHz. Architectures supported include split-mount (indoor/outdoor), all-outdoor and all-indoor radio designs to accommodate operators' specific needs.

References 

Companies listed on the Nasdaq
Telecommunications companies of the United States